"Your Eyes" was the fifth and last single from Kate Ryan's album Free (2008). The single was originally released in the beginning of May 2009 only in the Netherlands by Ryan's Dutch label Spinning Records. After a few weeks the song was released in Russia, in some of the surrounding countries and also some Eastern European countries. This was the second Kate Ryan single to not have a video after "UR (My Love)" (2001) and the first to be not released in her home country Belgium.

Track list 
 CD Single
"Your Eyes" (Radio Mix) - 3:21
"Your Eyes" (Album Version) - 3:44
"Dans Tes Yeux" (French Version) - 3:44
"Megamix" (Containing "Voyage Voyage", "Ella Elle L'a", "I Surrender", "Your Eyes") - 12:37

Charts

References 

2009 singles
Kate Ryan songs
Songs written by Jeanette Olsson
Songs written by Niklas Bergwall
Songs written by Niclas Kings
2008 songs
Universal Music Group singles
Songs written by Kate Ryan